Jason Ryan Holland (born April 30, 1976) is a Canadian-German former professional ice hockey defenceman. He played 81 games in the National Hockey League and spent the last seven years of his playing career in Germany.

Playing career
Holland was drafted in the second round, 38th overall, by the New York Islanders in the 1994 NHL Entry Draft.

After playing four seasons in the Western Hockey League with the Kamloops Blazers, winning the CHL Memorial Cup in 1994 and 1995, and playing for the victorious Canadian team at the 1996 World Junior Ice Hockey Championships, Holland made his professional debut in the American Hockey League with the Kentucky Thoroughblades during the 1996–97 season.  During the same season, he made his NHL debut with the Islanders, appearing in four games.

During the 1997–98 season, Holland was traded along with Paul Kruse to the Buffalo Sabres in exchange for Jason Dawe.  After three-plus seasons with the Sabres organization, mostly spent in the AHL with the Rochester Americans, Holland joined the Los Angeles Kings.  Once again, most of Holland's time with the organization was spent with their AHL affiliate, in this case the Manchester Monarchs.  Holland did spend the entire 2003–04 season with the Kings, appearing in 52 games and tallying six points.

Holland spent the 2005–06 season with ERC Ingolstadt of Germany's Deutsche Eishockey Liga, and remained with the team until the end of the 2008–09 season. On April 21, 2009, he signed a contract with another German DEL side, the Düsseldorfer EG Metro Stars, spending three years with the club. He retired after the 2011–12 season.

International play
A Canadian of German descent, Holland received a German passport in February 2007. He was chosen to play for the German national team for 2008 World Championships and he played games against Finland and Slovakia. Germany beat Slovakia 4–2, before it was found out that Holland was ineligible to play for Germany, because he had played only three seasons in Germany, while IIHF rules state that player who has represented another country (as Holland did in 1996, playing for Canada at the Junior World Championships) might change nationality after playing four seasons in the country. German victory was in jeopardy for a short time, but finally Germany was allowed to keep the points, while Holland was suspended from the tournament.

Career statistics

Regular season and playoffs

International

Awards and honours

References

External links
 

1976 births
Buffalo Sabres players
Canadian ice hockey defencemen
German ice hockey players
DEG Metro Stars players
ERC Ingolstadt players
HC Alleghe players
Ice hockey people from Alberta
Kamloops Blazers players
Kentucky Thoroughblades players
Living people
Los Angeles Kings players
Manchester Monarchs (AHL) players
Naturalized citizens of Germany
New York Islanders draft picks
New York Islanders players
People from Sturgeon County
Rochester Americans players
Canadian expatriate ice hockey players in Italy
Canadian expatriate ice hockey players in Germany